ESN may refer to:

 Eastern Security Network, the armed wing of the Indigenous People of Biafra (IPOB)
 Easton Airport (Maryland), United States
 Echo state network in computer science
 Edmonton Street News, a Canadian newspaper
 Einstein summation notation, used in mathematical physics
 Electronic serial number for mobile devices
 Emergency Services Network, in the UK
 Entertainment Studios Networks, an American cable network
 Erasmus Student Network, a European student organization
 European Sensory Network, studies the five senses
 European Society for Neurochemistry
 Salvadoran Sign Language